These are the results of the Women's double sculls competition, one of six events for female competitors in Rowing at the 2004 Summer Olympics in Athens.

Double Sculls women

Heats

Heat 1 - August 14, 11:00

Heat 2 - August 14, 11:10

Final

References

External links
Official Olympic Report

Women's Double Sculls
Women's Double Sculls
Women's events at the 2004 Summer Olympics